Argentine band Miranda! has released eight studio albums, two extended plays, two compilation albums, 52 singles (including eight as featured artists) and 52 music videos. Miranda!'s first two albums, Es Mentira (2002) and Sin Restricciones (2004) were released independently by Secsy Discos. The latter was certified platinum in Argentina, Colombia and Mexico.

In 2005, they signed a four-album deal with Pelo Music. On July 20, 2006, they released their first EP titled Quereme! Tributo a las Telenovelas, containing three new tracks that were formerly the theme songs of successful Argentine telenovelas. In 2007, they released El Disco de Tu Corazón, which topped the Argentine Albums chart, being their first to do so. Miranda Es Imposible! was released in 2009 and featured three singles. The singles "Ritmo y Decepción" and "Ya Lo Sabía", preceded their fifth studio album titled Magistral (2011), which was the band's first to chart on Spain, reaching number 90, likewise in Mexico where it reached number 92. They released their latest studio album with the label, Safari, on July 22, 2014.

In 2016 they signed with the international record company Sony Music, and a year later they released their album titled Fuerte, which had six singles, including "743" and "Quiero Vivir A Tu Lado," both of which reached the top 20 in Argentina and Uruguay. The group surprisingly released their second EP titled Precoz on December 13, 2019, which contains eight songs. After being postponed due to the COVID-19 pandemic, on May 7, 2021, they released the album Souvenir, which also featured six singles for its promotion, including they "Casi Feliz", which reached the top 13 in Uruguay.

Albums

Studio albums

Compilation albums

Live albums

Extended plays

Singles

As lead artist

As featured artist

Other appearances

Music videos

References 

Pop music discographies
Discographies of Argentine artists